Oscar Gregorio Azócar (February 21, 1965 – June 14, 2010) was a Venezuelan left fielder in Major League Baseball who played  for the New York Yankees (1990) and San Diego Padres (1991-'92). Listed at 6' 1", 170 lb., Azócar batted and threw left-handed. In 202 career games, Azócar recorded a batting average of .226 and accumulated 10 stolen bases, and 36 runs batted in (RBI).

Career
Azócar was born in Soro, Sucre, Venezuela. After attending high school in Venezuela, he was signed by the New York Yankees as an amateur free agent on November 22, 1983.

Until 1987 Azócar posted a record of 14–5 with a 2.30 earned run average as a professional pitcher, but then switched to the outfield. Azócar was a classic example of the impatient hitter who would swing at almost anything and usually put it in play. It took him 100 Major League at-bats to draw his first walk. He normally obliged the pitchers by hitting whatever they threw, and his batting average dropped accordingly.

In a three-season career, Azócar was a .226 hitter (99-for-439) with five home runs and 36 runs batted in in 202 games, including 38 runs scored, 16 doubles, 10 stolen bases and 12 base on balls. Despite his free-swinging style, he had only 36 strikeouts in 439 at-bats (one every 12 at-bats). Azócar also used his speed selectively and never was caught stealing.

Azócar died in 2010 in Valencia, Carabobo, at the age of 45 of a heart attack. The same year, he was inducted in the Caribbean Baseball Hall of Fame for his notable contributions in the Caribbean Series.

See also
 List of players from Venezuela in Major League Baseball

References

External links

Retrosheet
Venezuelan Professional Baseball League statistics

1965 births
2010 deaths
Albany-Colonie Yankees players
Baseball pitchers
Caribes de Oriente players
Charros de Jalisco players
Columbus Clippers players
Fort Lauderdale Yankees players
Guerreros de Oaxaca players
Gulf Coast Yankees players
Las Vegas Stars (baseball) players
Leones de Yucatán players
Leones del Caracas players
Major League Baseball left fielders
Major League Baseball players from Venezuela
Mayas de Chetumal players
Mexican League baseball first basemen
Mexican League baseball left fielders
Mexican League baseball right fielders
Navegantes del Magallanes players
New York Yankees players
Oneonta Yankees players
People from Sucre (state)
Petroleros de Poza Rica players
Rojos del Águila de Veracruz players
San Diego Padres players
Tiburones de La Guaira players
Tigres de Aragua players
Venezuelan expatriate baseball players in Mexico
Venezuelan expatriate baseball players in the United States